Beasts of No Nation is a 2015 American war drama film written, co-produced, shot, and directed by Cary Joji Fukunaga. It follows a young boy who becomes a child soldier as his country experiences a horrific civil war. Shot in Ghana and starring Idris Elba, Abraham Attah, Ama K. Abebrese, Grace Nortey, David Dontoh, and Opeyemi Fagbohungbe, the film is based on the 2005 novel of the same name by Uzodinma Iweala, the book itself being named after a Fela Kuti album.

It was screened in the main competition section of the 72nd Venice International Film Festival, where it won the Marcello Mastroianni Award. The film was shown in the Special Presentation section of the 2015 Toronto International Film Festival, and released on Netflix globally and in a limited release by Bleecker Street on October 16, 2015.

Plot
A civil war is breaking out in an unspecified West African country. A young boy, Agu, lives in a small village with his parents, older brother, and younger sibling. Agu's village is located within a "buffer zone" enforced by ECOMOG troops. The village is informed that the government has fallen and military-aligned rebels have seized control of the country. With rebel forces headed towards the village, many people flee to the country's capital for safety. Agu's father buys safe transport for his wife and two youngest children, but has to stay behind with Agu and his eldest son. Rebel and government forces fight in and around Agu's village. While the rebel soldiers flee, government forces round up the remaining villagers and execute them, but Agu evades capture and escapes into the jungle.

After wandering for an unspecified amount of time, Agu is caught up in a guerrilla skirmish. The Native Defense Forces (NDF), a rising rebel faction in the country, adopts Agu into their ranks. Agu's battalion is led by the Commandant, who takes Agu under his wing. Following a brutal initiation process where Agu hacks an innocent captive to death with a machete, Agu becomes a fully-fledged member of the militia. Agu befriends another young NDF child soldier, Strika, who never speaks. One night, the Commandant summons Agu to his quarters and rapes him. Strika, another of the Commandant's rape victims, comforts him. Preacher, an older soldier, gives Agu brown-brown to lift his mood. Agu and Strika take part in a number of bloody battles and ambushes. During one of the raids Agu, under the influence of brown-brown, mistakes a village-woman during a raid for his mother. He exclaims that he found her and clings to her while the other members of the group declare they want to rape her. The woman says not to recognise Agu and he calls her a witch woman. One of the other child soldiers drags the young girl with the woman and stomps the child to death. Agu joins in. He wonders if God sees what he is doing. Agu then shoots the woman while she is being raped on a bed.

The battalion's many victories earn them a summons to the rebel headquarters, where the Commandant, accompanied by Agu, Strika, and a few other soldiers, go to meet with the NDF leader, Dada Goodblood. Goodblood, who stresses the importance of public image in the wake of the conflict becoming world news, denies the Commandant the promotion to General as he had promised, and removes him from command. The Commandant's lieutenant, Two I-C, will take control of the battalion, and the Commandant will be made Deputy Chief of Security under the leader. The Commandant views this as an insult, and leaves to "celebrate" one more night with his men at a brothel. While the soldiers (except for Agu and Strika) spend the night with the brothel's women, one of the women shoots Two I-C. Two I-C accuses the Commandant of orchestrating the incident before dying, while the Commandant insists it must have been a botched attempt against himself. The prostitute professes that it was an accident, but the Commandant and his men shoot the women and leave the city with the battalion.

Now on the run from their own faction as well as their enemies, the battalion suffers heavy losses. Airstrikes and supply shortages kill many of them, including Strika. The remaining members of the battalion take shelter at a gold mine for several months, hoping to find gold to pay for supplies. Ammunition runs out, leaving the group with no way to defend themselves from encroaching enemy forces. Following a confrontation between a frustrated Preacher and paranoid Commandant, Agu and the soldiers all abandon the Commandant to surrender, ignoring his warnings that they will merely be thrown in jail and disowned by their families. Shortly after, they are detained by UN troops.

The younger members of the battalion are sent to a missionary school in a safe part of the country. Preacher and Randy decide to run away to rejoin the war. Agu stays away from the other children, who play games and enjoy the comfort and safety of the school. Agu suffers from drug withdrawal and is tormented by what has happened and has nightmares about it. After much time has passed, Agu tells the school's counselor that he has done some terrible things, which he fears will make her see him as a "beast". Instead he tells of how he used to be a good boy from a family who loved him. The final scene shows Agu finally joining the other boys as they swim and play in the ocean.

Cast

Production
Cary Joji Fukunaga directed his own script, after having worked on it for seven years. It was not until after six years of research on the Sierra Leone Civil War that Fukunaga came across the Beasts of No Nation novel. He told Creative Screenwriting, "I read through the novel and I loved the elegant and concise way that Uzodinma Iweala told the story.  I felt that would be the best way to enter the subject."

The dialogue in the screenplay is faithful in form to the novel, originally written in a lighter form of Nigerian Pidgin English known as Krio.

On August 20, 2013, Idris Elba joined the cast of the film adaptation.  On June 6, 2014, Ghanaian actors Ama K. Abebrese, Grace Nortey and David Dontoh joined the film. Later, Opeyemi Fagbohungbe also joined the cast.

Red Crown Productions was the financier and producer, along with Primary Productions and Parliament of Owls. On May 17, 2014, Participant Media, along with Mammoth Entertainment, came on board to co-finance the film, initially budgeted at $4.3 million but which ultimately cost about $6 million.

On June 5, 2014, principal photography was underway in the Eastern Region of Ghana. The film was shot at locations in Koforidua and Ezile Bay at Akwidaa. Dan Romer scored the film.

Release
Netflix bought the worldwide distribution rights for around $12 million. The film was simultaneously released theatrically and online through its subscription video on demand service on October 16, 2015, with Bleecker Street handling the theatrical release. Considering the online release a violation of the traditional 90-day release window of exclusivity to theatres, AMC Cinemas, Carmike Cinemas, Cinemark, and Regal Entertainment Group—four of the largest theater chains in the United States—announced that they would boycott Beasts of No Nation, effectively downgrading it to a limited release at smaller and independent theatres. The film was also theatrically released in the UK on October 16, 2015, in Curzon Cinemas.

Critical reception
On Rotten Tomatoes, the film has a rating of 92% based on 146 reviews, with an average rating of 7.90/10. The website's critical consensus reads, "Beasts of No Nation finds writer-director Cary Fukunaga working with a talented cast to offer a sobering, uncompromising, yet still somehow hopeful picture of war's human cost." On Metacritic, the film has a score of 79 out of 100, based on 30 critics, indicating "generally favourable reviews".

Home media
The film was released on Blu-ray and DVD by The Criterion Collection on August 31, 2021.

Controversy
In 2015, Artnet published an article suggesting that Fukunaga had appropriated content without crediting the work of Irish artist Richard Mosse, whose work used infrared film and depicted child soldiers in the Democratic Republic of Congo.

Accolades

References

External links
  on Netflix
 
 
 
Beasts of No Nation: A Different Kind of African War Film an essay by Robert Daniels at the Criterion Collection

2015 films
2015 independent films
Twi-language films
2015 war drama films
American war drama films
Films about child soldiers
Films about war crimes
Films based on American novels
Films based on Nigerian novels
Films directed by Cary Joji Fukunaga
Films scored by Dan Romer
Films set in Africa
Films shot in Ghana
Participant (company) films
English-language Netflix original films
Bleecker Street films
Films with screenplays by Cary Joji Fukunaga
2015 drama films
Guerrilla warfare in film
2010s English-language films
2010s American films